Emmanuel Tawanda Chenda (born 25 December 1952) is a Zambian politician and diplomat. He served as Member of the National Assembly for Bwana Mkubwa between 2011 and 2016. He also held the posts of Minister of Agriculture and Livestock, Minister of Commerce, Trade and Industry and Minister of Local Government and Housing between 2011 and 2015. In November 2017 he was appointed Ambassador to neighbouring Zimbabwe.

Biography
Chenda studied for a certificate in mediation and arbitration, a diploma in accountancy and a post-graduate diploma in development finance and worked as an accountant. In 1986 he was appointed Treasurer of Lusaka City Council, before sering as Town Clerk of Ndola between 1991 and 2001.

Chenda contested the Bwana Mkubwa seat in the 2001 general elections as the Forum for Democracy and Development candidate, but was defeated by Paul Katema of the Movement for Multi-Party Democracy. He ran again in the 2011 general elections representing the Patriotic Front (PF) after the incumbent PF MP Joseph Zulu was expelled from the party, and was elected to the National Assembly.

After being elected, Chenda was appointed Minister of Agriculture and Livestock. In February 2013 he was made Minister of Commerce, Trade and Industry, In March 2014 he became Minister of Local Government and Housing. He lost his place in the government in February 2015 when new President Edgar Lungu appointed a new cabinet.

Chenda did not run in the 2016 general elections and was succeeded as MP for Bwana Mkubwa by PF candidate Jonas Chanda. In November 2017 he was appointed Ambassador to Zimbabwe.

References

1952 births
Living people
Zambian accountants
Forum for Democracy and Development politicians
Patriotic Front (Zambia) politicians
Members of the National Assembly of Zambia
Agriculture ministers of Zambia
Commerce, Trade and Industry ministers of Zambia
Local government ministers of Zambia
Ambassadors of Zambia
Ambassadors to Zimbabwe